The Rhett House Inn, is a historic Inn at 1009 Craven Street, Beaufort, South Carolina. It is significant as the home of Thomas Moore Rhett and his wife, Caroline Barnwell, who were early pioneers in South Carolina in the 1800s. The Inn is in the Point neighborhood, which is part of the Beaufort Historic District. Today, the Rhett House Inn serves as a Four Diamond bed and breakfast Inn.

History

Construction records date the house to ca. 1920. Thomas Moore Rhett and his wife, Caroline Barnwell, owned the two-story,  Federal and Greek Revival style mansion up to the American Civil War. Thomas Moore Rhett's last name was Smith but at the request of his uncle, Colonel William Rhett, he changed it to Rhett. Rhett owned a plantation on the Ashepoo River with enslaved African Americans living and working on the property. In 1850, Rhett advertised in The Charleston Mercury giving a fifty dollar reward for the apprehension and delivery to the nearest jail of a slave named Sampson. Rhett died on December 26, 1860 and is buried at the Saint Helena's Episcopal Churchyard in Buefort.

The Inn sits on a masonry basement with a porch on the south and west sides and faces the Beaufort River. Greek Doric columns support the upper and lower porches. After the Civil War, the Thomas Rhett House was a hospital for injured soldiers. Changes to the house were made in the late 1800s. From the 1900s until the mid-1930s, the Thomas Rhett house was a private home. At the end of the 1930s, the Tucker family bought the house, and it was known as The Tucker Inn. Jane Ridings, the eldest daughter of the Tuckers, bought the Inn from her parents and changed the name to Cherokee Inn. In the 1950s, she sold the inn to Best Western, which sold it to Alcoa South Carolina, a subsidiary of Alcoa, to be used as corporate offices during the development of the Dataw Island Resort.

In 1986, Steve and Marianne Harrison bought the inn. They added three guest rooms, which gave the inn a total of ten rooms. For the next five years, they improved all the quest rooms and common areas, and added bathrooms upstairs, telephones, and televisions to all the rooms. The Harrisons bought, across Newcastle Street, the former Freedmen's Store, in 1996 and refurbished it with 7 additional guest rooms, which gave the inn 17-rooms.

Notable people
 Sandra Bullock stayed in Room 2
 Gwyneth Paltrow stayed in Room 3
 Barbra Streisand stayed in Room 3 and Room 4          
 Kevin Bacon & Kyra Sedgwick stayed in Room 4
 Robin Givens stayed in Room 8                                    
 Blythe Danner stayed in Room 10
 Ben Affleck stayed in Room 10                              
 Robert Redford stayed in Newcastle House                            
 Gabriel Byrne stayed in Newcastle House                    
 Tom Hanks stayed in Newcastle House

See also
 List of hotels in the United States
 List of National Historic Landmarks in South Carolina
 National Register of Historic Places listings in Beaufort County, South Carolina
 Beaufort Historic District (Beaufort, South Carolina)
 Robert Barnwell Rhett House
 Col. William Rhett House

References

External links

 Official Website

Buildings and structures in Beaufort, South Carolina
Hotel buildings completed in 1820
Hotels established in 1820
1820 establishments in South Carolina